List of skate spots in San Francisco, California:

References

Skateboarding spots
San Francisco